The  is a Japanese statute enacted in 1962 which governs lawsuits involving the government of Japan. It overlays the Code of Civil Procedure, and the Code governs such cases to the extent the Act is silent.

Types of administrative litigation

The Act provides for four types of :

 , an in-court appeal of an unlawful use of government authority. Such a claim may seek to cancel a government act (by far the most common type of administrative litigation), declare an act legally invalid, declare an inaction illegal, impose a duty or provide an injunction against future acts.
 , which requires the resolution of a public law issue in the context of a private dispute. Most such cases are treated as ordinary civil litigation, so few cases are heard under the ex parte system. Common examples of ex parte cases include confirmation of Japanese nationality, and expropriation claims.
 , essentially a class action of affected individuals against the government. The most common types are election-related litigation and citizen suits under the Local Autonomy Law.
 , litigation between administrative entities or organs.

Objection by the Prime Minister 

This is prescribed by the article 27 in the law. This institution is in only Japan, and no similar institution in another country.

Many administrative law jurists do not admit that this institution is constitutional, by reason of that violation to the principle of separation of powers.

However in 1969, the Tokyo District Court reject crime of a jurist who appeal that this institution is not constitutional.

Administrative litigation versus other means of appeal

The Administrative Appeal Act may also be used to appeal a wrongful government act. Administrative appeals are made directly to the government body whose act is being appealed. Ordinarily the petitioner may choose either venue to contest a government act. However, there are certain special cases (such as tax-related claims) where an administrative appeal process must be completed before a court may hear the case.

Note

References 

 .

External links
Administrative Case Litigation Act (in English), Ministry of Justice, Japan

Japanese legislation
Government of Japan